Ángel Riveras (2 October 1908 – 2 October 1993) was a Spanish sailor. He competed in the Dragon event at the 1968 Summer Olympics.

References

External links
 

1908 births
1993 deaths
Spanish male sailors (sport)
Olympic sailors of Spain
Sailors at the 1968 Summer Olympics – Dragon
Sportspeople from Zaragoza
Snipe class sailors